Niphadostola is a genus of moths belonging to the family Tortricidae.

Species
Niphadostola asceta Diakonoff, 1989
Niphadostola chionea Diakonoff, 1989
Niphadostola crocosema Diakonoff, 1989

See also
List of Tortricidae genera

References

External links
tortricidae.com

Tortricidae genera
Olethreutinae
Taxa named by Alexey Diakonoff